Brandenberger is a surname. Notable people with the surname include:

Erich Brandenberger (1892–1955), German general in the Wehrmacht of Nazi Germany during World War II
Hans Brandenberger (1912–2003), Swiss sculptor
Jacques E. Brandenberger (1872–1954), Swiss chemist and textile engineer
Robert Brandenberger (born 1956), Swiss-Canadian theoretical cosmologist and a professor of physics

See also 
Brandenberger Ache, a river of Bavaria (Germany)
Brandenberger Alps, a sub-group of the Northern Limestone Alps (Austria)
Brandenberger Bluff, a steep rock bluff (Marie Byrd Land, West Antarctica)
Brandenburger (surname)